Guhsania is an extinct  ammonoid cephalopod genus that lived during the early Middle Jurassic (early Bajocian), from about 171.5  to 173.5 Ma.

Guhsania belongs to the Sonniniidae, a member of the Hildoceratoidea superfamily. The shell (conch): essentially involute and ribbed throughout, umbilical edge sharp, outer whorl oxyconic.

References

Ammonitida genera
Sonniniidae
Middle Jurassic ammonites